Brevefilum is a bacteria genus from the family of Anaerolineaceae with one known species (Brevefilum fermentans).

References

Chloroflexota
Bacteria genera
Monotypic bacteria genera